"Nothing in This World" is a song by American media personality and socialite Paris Hilton from her debut studio album Paris (2006). It was released as the second and final single from the album on August 28, 2006, by Warner Bros. Records. The song was written and produced by Lukasz "Dr. Luke" Gottwald, with additional writing by Sheppard Solomon.

Release and reception
Billboard called it "another undeniably catchy, hook-happy midtempo jewel". It was officially sent to Top 40/Mainstream radio in the United States on August 28, 2006. In the United Kingdom, the physical single was released on November 6, 2006, with the single being possible to download a week earlier. The single made number 12 on the US Billboard Hot Dance Club Play chart.

Music video
The music video for "Nothing in This World" was shot by Scott Speer in Los Angeles on September 5 and 6, 2006, in South Pasadena and Long Beach Polytechnic High School, California. In this video, Hilton parodies teen flick The Girl Next Door with her own mock movie trailer in which she plays a sexy starlet loved and adored by an incessantly teased, teenage neighbour (played by Nick Lane). Elisha Cuthbert, the original Girl star, makes a cameo and also with an early appearance of actor/model Scott Elrod as the boyfriend. The video premiered on September 22 as an AOL First View, and premiered in Canada on MuchMusic. The video is also popular on YouTube, having received more than 15.5 million views. The video also spent 7 weeks on the VH1 Top 20 Video Countdown, where it peaked at number 5 during its fourth week.

Track listing
Digital download (Remixes)
"Nothing in This World" — 3:12
"Nothing in This World" (Jason Nevins Radio Remix) — 3:15
"Nothing in This World" (Kaskade Radio Remix) — 3:33
"Nothing in This World" (Dave Audé Radio Edit) — 3:55
"Nothing in This World" (Exacta Remix Edit) — 4:57

US CD single
"Nothing in This World" (Jason Nevins Radio Remix) — 3:13
"Nothing in This World" (Jason Nevins Extended Remix) — 6:06
"Nothing in This World" (Jason Nevins Dub) — 8:12
"Nothing in This World" (Dave Audé Vocal) — 7:55
"Nothing in This World" (Dave Aude Mixshow) — 6:01
"Nothing in This World" (Kaskade Remix) — 6:58
"Nothing in This World" (Kaskade Dub) — 6:19
"Nothing in This World" (Kaskade Radio Remix) — 3:31
"Nothing in This World" (Exacta Remix) — 7:08

German CD single
"Nothing in This World" (Album Version) — 3:10
"Nothing in This World" (Jason Nevins Radio Remix) — 3:13
"Nothing in This World" (Kaskade Remix) — 6:58
"Nothing in This World" (Dave Aude Mixshow) — 6:01

Charts

Release history

References

2006 singles
2006 songs
Music videos directed by Scott Speer
Paris Hilton songs
Song recordings produced by Dr. Luke
Songs written by Dr. Luke
Songs written by Sheppard Solomon